Smith S. Wilkinson (December 7, 1824April 9, 1889) was an American lawyer and Republican politician.  He served four years in the Wisconsin State Senate and was President pro tempore of the Wisconsin Senate for the 1864 session.

Biography

Wilkinson was born December 7, 1824, in Elbridge, New York, to Shubael Wilkinson and Mahala Smith. He married Helen M. Tabor, became a lawyer and raised a family in Prairie du Lac, Wisconsin, (now Milton). Wilkinson represented the 14th State Senate district during the 1862, 1863, 1864 and 1865 sessions and was President pro tempore of the Senate for the 1864 session. He was a Republican and was affiliated with the National Union Party during the American Civil War.  He died on April 9, 1889, and is buried in Adrian, Michigan.

References

External links
 The Political Graveyard
 

1824 births
1889 deaths
People from Elbridge, New York
People from Milton, Wisconsin
Republican Party Wisconsin state senators
19th-century American politicians